Eufrozyna is the Polish language variant of the name Euphrosyne.

It may refer to:
Euphrosyne of Greater Poland (1247/50 – 1298), a Greater Poland princess, member of the House of Piast and Abbess of St. Clara in Trzebnica
Euphrosyne of Masovia (1292 – 1328/1329), a Duchess of Oświęcim by marriage
Euphrosyne of Opole (1228/30 – 1292), a daughter of Casimir I of Opole and his wife Viola, Duchess of Opole

Polish given names